Alexandrea Anacan is a Philippine-born New Zealand karate athlete. A resident of Auckland, Anacan represents New Zealand internationally. She is a four-time consecutive gold medalist in the World Karate Federation (Continental Championship) Oceanian Karate Federation (OKF), entering competition in 2016. Her achievements include finishing 2nd at the Commonwealth Karate Championships, 5th at the Karate World Games (winning the Oceania qualifying competition outright) and 3rd place at the World University Games, the largest international multi-sport event other than the Olympics.

Early life
Anacan began practising Karate at the age of four. She won several medals, including gold, silver and bronze medals in the Auckland Open, New Zealand Open, Australian Open, New Zealand Nationals, and Hamilton Open. She participated in World Beach Games and Pre-Olympic Qualification.

When her family moved to Auckland, Anacan began training with the SSKANZ school.

Career 
She became an instructor for SSKANZ and a national judge and referee.

She competes as a member of the New Zealand national karate team.

2020 Summer Olympics 
She qualified for the 2020 Summer Olympics in Tokyo, Japan Continental Representation qualifying spots, where karate featured for the first time. She represented New Zealand at the karate competition. In the women's kata event, she finished in 5th place in the elimination round and she did not advance to compete in a medal match.

Record

References

External links

Living people
Place of birth missing (living people)
New Zealand female karateka
Sportspeople from Auckland
Filipino emigrants to New Zealand
Karateka at the 2020 Summer Olympics
1990 births
Competitors at the 2022 World Games